SplashDown Waterpark, a waterpark located within Ben Lomond Regional Park in Sudley, Virginia (near Manassas), is operated by the Prince William County Department of Parks and Recreation.  The park was built at the location of the Ben Lomond swimming pool, opening in May 1996.  Among slides and wading pools, the facility also houses a 25-meter competition pool.

Park attractions 
 Five Water Areas
 Zero Depth Beach Area
 Water Raindrops & Bubblers
 770 ft. Lazy River
 Children's Area with 4 Water Slides
 Two 4-Story Waterslides
 Two fast Cannonball Slides
 25 Meter Leisure Pool
 Log Walks & Lily Pad Walk
 Two Tropical Twister Waterslides

Swim Team
SplashDown Waterpark is the home of the Ben Lomond Flying Ducks Swim Team.

References

External links 
SplashDown Waterpark
 Ben Lomond Flying Ducks

Buildings and structures in Prince William County, Virginia
Water parks in Virginia
Tourist attractions in Prince William County, Virginia
Sudley, Virginia
1996 establishments in Virginia